My Ambition is a 2006 short film produced by k2 Productions. Based on the 1951 Richard Matheson short story "Blood Son", it was written for the screen and directed by Keith Dinielli.

Plot
In this short film a young man, Jules Walter, gets kicked out of school because he has an unhealthy obsession with vampires. While spending time at a local zoo, Jules manages to steal a bat and sneak it away to an old shack by the railyards. It is there that Jules' obsession with vampires will lead to his demise.

2006 horror films
2006 films
Films based on short fiction
Films based on works by Richard Matheson
American supernatural horror films
American horror short films
American vampire films
2000s English-language films
2000s American films